The Passion Master is the name used to refer to an anonymous fresco painter and his workshop, active on Gotland during the 15th century. Works in about fifty churches have been attributed to the artist. The style of the Master of the Passion of Christ has been described as schematic and even primitive.

Works identified as being by the artist can be found among others in Anga, Etelhem, Gammelgarn and Hörsne churches.

See also
 Church frescos in Sweden

References

Swedish painters
Church frescos in Sweden